The following is a list of natural disasters that have affected Pakistan.

See also
List of floods in Pakistan
List of earthquakes in Pakistan
List of tropical cyclones in Pakistan
List of extreme weather records in Pakistan
Drought in Pakistan

External links
 Pakistan Top 10 Natural Disasters

 
Lists of events in Pakistan
Pakistan
Pakistan